WEW (770 AM) is a radio station licensed to serve St. Louis, Missouri. Owned by Birach Broadcasting Corporation, the station features a brokered ethnic format, except for a midday show which features a mix of easy listening, adult standards and big band music. WEW's daily schedule consists entirely of programming provided by Overcomer Ministry. The studios are located on Hampton Avenue in St. Louis, and its transmitter is located in Caseyville, Illinois. The station now airs Brother Stair 24/7.

WEW is licensed to only broadcast during daytime hours, with a power of 1,000 watts on 770 kHz. On April 28, 2016 the station was granted a Federal Communications Commission construction permit to move to a new transmitter site, increase day power to 10,000 watts and add nighttime operation with 200 watts while still protecting clear-channel station WABC (AM) in New York City.

WEW is regarded as one of the oldest radio stations in the United States. First licensed in March 1922, WEW is a continuation of earlier broadcasts inaugurated in April 1921 by Saint Louis University under a Technical and Training School station authorization.

History

WEW was first licensed as a broadcasting station on March 23, 1922 to Saint Louis University (SLU), however, previous radio experimentation at the University dated back to 1912. In February 1915, SLU was issued a license to operate a "Technical and Training School" station assigned the call sign of 9YR, and in May 1916 this station's license was changed to an "Experimental" authorization, with a new call sign of 9XY. These early operations used Morse code to transmit seismological and weather information. However, with the entrance of the United States into World War One in April 1917, all civilian stations were ordered to cease operations, and the University's radio station was shut down for the duration of the conflict. During the war, the college trained over 300 radio operators for the United States Army.

9YK
With the end of the war and the subsequent re-establishment of civilian radio, in August 1920 the University was again issued a "Technical and Training School" license, now with the call sign of 9YK. George E. Rueppel, S.J., a Catholic lay brother in the Jesuit religious order, who was assistant director of the Meteorological Observatory at SLU, had the primary responsibility for the pre-war stations, and he resumed his duties with the establishment of 9YK.

During the war, advances in vacuum tube design now made audio transmissions practical, and 9YK was upgraded to take advantage of this new technology. In late March 1921, it was announced that the United States Weather Bureau, in conjunction with the SLU Department of Science, had received permission from Washington authorities to make twice-daily broadcasts of the official weather reports for Missouri and Illinois, in addition to reporting the local river stages. This new service made its debut over 9YK at 10:05 a.m. on April 26, 1921, when the SLU president, the Reverend William Robison, S.J., made an introductory statement, then read a 500-word Weather Bureau bulletin. 9YK was the second radio station authorized by the Weather Bureau to make audio weather forecast broadcasts, and the first to include river reports. On August 22 livestock, grain and provision market reports were added to the broadcast schedule at 2 p.m. daily at 350 meters (857 kHz); the weather reports aired at 10 a.m.

WEW
Initially there were no specific standards for stations making general broadcasts, until the Department of Commerce, which regulated radio at this time, adopted regulations effective December 1, 1921 for a new classification of "broadcasting stations". Two transmitting wavelengths were set aside for this new service—360 meters (833 kilohertz) for "entertainment" and 485 meters (619 kilohertz) for "market and weather reports"—and stations providing programs intended for the general public were now required to obtain a Limited Commercial license that included a broadcast service assignment. The University was issued its first broadcasting station authorization, for 485 meters, on March 23, 1922, with the randomly assigned call letters of WEW. WEW was the second Saint Louis station to receive a broadcasting authorization, following the Post-Dispatch's KSD (now KTRS), which had been licensed earlier that month. However, WEW has generally included the prior 9YK operations as part of its broadcasting history, so it has traditionally celebrated April 26, 1921 as its founding date.

On May 31, 1922, the station was authorized to also broadcast on the 360 meter (833 kHz) entertainment wavelength. Over the next few years WEW was shifted to a number of other operating frequencies, until November 1928 when it settled on 760 kHz as part of a nationwide reallocation, now limited to daytime-only operation. Subsequently, on March 29, 1941, all radio stations on 760 were moved to 770 kHz, WEW's current dial position, under the provisions of the North American Regional Broadcasting Agreement.

WEW introduced a number of innovative programs, featuring talks by the faculty, and programs that included "Parents' Forum", the "Science Series", "Farm School", the "Amateur Radio Forum", and the "Editorial Page of the Air". It has also been suggested that the "Question Box Hour", a feature from 1923 described as "the first Catholic inquiry forum of the air", was also the first radio quiz show.

Unlike most early radio stations licensed to educational institutions, WEW continued to be operated by the University despite the financial difficulties caused by the Great Depression. In 1928, the station was on the air for an average of only eight hours per week, but by 1937 its weekly broadcast schedule had expanded to fifty-seven hours of "service, education, and entertainment" programming. Studios were housed on the top floor of SLU's Law School (currently O'Neil Hall), and the transmitter tower, which would be torn down in 1954, was located roughly where Pius XII Memorial Library now stands. Brother George E. Rueppel continued active participation with the station until his death in 1947, serving at times as "engineer... station manager, program director, continuity writer, platter turner, announcer, talent scout, auditioner, and star performer".

The University was the first in the St. Louis area to receive a permit for an FM station, which was initially authorized in 1941 with the call sign K51L, transmitting on 45.1 MHz. The call was later changed to WEW-FM, which began broadcasting on May 17, 1947, using a 542-foot (165 meter) tall transmission tower constructed on the university's campus. Because the AM station's license limited it to daytime hours, the FM signal provided the opportunity for nighttime programs. However, in December 1949, SLU president the Reverend Paul C. Reinert, S.J. announced that WEW-FM would be shut down, "because FM broadcasting has not been accepted by the general public".

A few years later the University exited broadcasting altogether—with the limited exception of a student-run carrier current station, "KBIL"—when it sold WEW to a company headed by Aubrey D. Reid, a news director at KXOK (630 AM) who went by the professional name of Bruce Barrington. Following the sale of the station, in June 1955 WEW's format was changed from an educational one that featured classical music to a commercial operation broadcasting country and western music. WEW was sold again five years later. In 1964, the station was purchased by Charles Stanley, who moved the studios to various locations, including the (original) new Busch Stadium upon completion of the stadium; the only radio station located in a major sports stadium. (Stanley, aka, Charlie, and was known for trading merchandise for commercial time.) Other studio locations have included "The Hill", Busch Stadium, Soulard, and Clayton. WEW was later owned by the Broadcast Center, then by a rich Texan named Gary Acker through his Metropolitan Radio Group, Inc., which transferred the station to Birach Broadcasting Corporation on January 6, 2004.

Priority status
Station publicity has commonly claimed that WEW is "the second oldest radio station in the United States", while crediting KDKA in Pittsburgh, Pennsylvania, which began regular broadcasts (as 8ZZ) on November 2, 1920, as the first. This in turn is said to make WEW the "oldest broadcast station west of the Mississippi River". This assertion uses April 26, 1921, the date that 9YK made its first audio weather report broadcast, as the starting date for combined 9YK/WEW operations. However, numerous other stations, on both sides of the Mississippi River, have earlier establishment dates than both KDKA and WEW when combined with their predecessor operations, including 8MK/WWJ in Detroit, Michigan, which began regular broadcasts in August 1920, WOC in Davenport, Iowa, which traces its origin to station 9BY, which began regular broadcasts around September 1920, 9ZAF/KLZ in Denver, Colorado, with regular programs beginning in October 1920, and 9XM/WHA in Madison, Wisconsin, which began transmitting weather forecasts in January 1921.

References

External links

Collection of WEW materials from Saint Louis University Libraries Special Collections
"770 WEW: 'The first voice in St. Louis'" (circa 1996) — KTVI reporter John Auble reports on WEW's then month-and-a-half-old kitchen studio
"History of WEW St. Louis" — later KTVI 9 p.m. news report with John Brown, discussing Bosnian programming
WEW Radio Collection finding aid at the St. Louis Public Library

µ
Radio stations established in 1912
Adult standards radio stations in the United States
Saint Louis University
Birach Broadcasting Corporation stations
1912 establishments in Missouri
Ω
Radio stations licensed before 1923 and still broadcasting